The  is a commuter electric multiple unit (EMU) train type operated by the private railway operator Hankyu Corporation on Hankyu Kobe Main Line services since November 2013, and on the Hankyu Takarazuka Main Line since December 2013.

Overview
Based on the 9000 series and 9300 series EMUs first introduced in 2003, the 8-car 1000 series trains are manufactured by Hitachi and have aluminium alloy bodies with a double-skin construction. The trains are driven by fully enclosed permanent magnet synchronous motors (PMSM) supplied by Toshiba Corporation. Externally, the trains are finished in the standard Hankyu colour scheme of all-over maroon.

Formation
, nine eight-car trains (units 1000 to 1008) are in service, formed as shown below, with four motored (M) cars and four non-powered trailer (T) cars.

The "M" cars (1500 and 1550) each have two single-arm pantographs.

Interior
Passenger accommodation consists of longitudinal bench seating throughout, with "golden olive" coloured moquette seat covers. Internally, the trains use LED lighting throughout. Each car includes a wheelchair space at one end.

Passenger information is provided by 32-inch half-height LCD displays supplied by Toshiba Corporation, with information provided in Japanese, English, Chinese, and Korean.

History
The first set, 1000, underwent test running from October 2013. It entered passenger service from 28 November 2013, following a special departure ceremony at Umeda Station. The first Takarazuka Line set, 1001, entered service on 25 December 2013.

Fleet history
The build details for the fleet are as shown below.

See also
 Hankyu 1300 series, a similar variant for use on the Kyoto Lines from 2014

References

External links

  

Electric multiple units of Japan
1000 series
Train-related introductions in 2013
1500 V DC multiple units of Japan
Hitachi multiple units